Guam Highway 11 (GH-11) is one of the primary automobile highways in the United States territory of Guam.

Route description
This spur route from GH-1 runs westward along Cabras Island, a narrow peninsula which forms the northern edge of Apra Harbor. This area houses Guam's commercial port facilities, making GH-11 an important transport route. The Port Authority of Guam is located on this highway within the port facilities. The road's designation ends at the control gate to the access road leading out to the man-made Glass Breakwater.

Major intersections

The entire highway is in Piti, Guam.

References

11